Cheong Yang-seog (born 25 November 1958) is a South Korean politician in the conservative People Power Party who was elected member of the National Assembly for Gangbuk, Seoul, in the 2016 parliamentary election. He previously represented the same constituency between 2008 and 2012.

In his first term as an assemblyman, Cheong was a member of the Assembly's Strategy and Finance Committee. In 2010, he introduced a bill to increase the basic tax deduction for salaried workers from 1 million to 2 million South Korean won. He was appointed Second Deputy Secretary-General of the Saenuri Party in 2014.

Cheong was born in Boseong County, South Jeolla Province, and studied at the Korea Army Officer Candidate School before taking a course in political science at Sogang University. He entered politics as a member of the Democratic Justice Party of President Chun Doo-hwan in 1984.

On 19 October 2020, he was appointed the new Secretary-General of the People Power Party (PPP), replacing Kim Seon-dong who had resigned 5 days ago.

References

1958 births
Democratic Justice Party politicians
Living people
Members of the National Assembly (South Korea)
People from Boseong County
Liberty Korea Party politicians
Sogang University alumni